Tsing Ma Control Area (Chinese: 青馬管制區; TMCA) is an area covering Lantau Link and related road networks in the New Territories, Hong Kong, including Tsing Ma Bridge, Kap Shui Mun Bridge, Ma Wan Viaduct (all part of the Lantau Link), Cheung Tsing Highway, Cheung Tsing Tunnel, Cheung Tsing Bridge (Cheung Tsing Tunnel and Cheung Tsing Bridge ), Ting Kau Bridge (belongs to Tsing Long Highway, a part of Route 3),  (also belongs at Route 3), Tsing Kwai Highway and North Lantau Highway, but excluding the area of rails managed by the MTRCL.

Extra traffic regulations are enforced in the area.

The area is currently managed and maintained by the Tsing Ma Management Limited. One of its incomes is collecting toll and fee of Lantau Link at Lantau Toll Plaza.

TMCA maintains two double-ended wide-body ambulances, dispatched in the event of a major traffic accident. They were converted from retired Neoplan Airliner N 922-2 airport buses.

External links
A brief introduction by Tsing Ma Management Limited
Legislation on the Tsing Ma Control Area (Chapter 498 in the Law of Hong Kong) 
Regulations in the area

Expressways in Hong Kong
Tsing Yi
Ma Wan
Kwai Chung
Lantau Island